Saint Mary Cemetery is a Roman Catholic burial ground located at 45th and Penn Avenues in the  Central Lawrenceville neighborhood of Pittsburgh, Pennsylvania, US. It is adjacent (just south) of the city's slightly older and much larger Allegheny Cemetery.  A chain-link fence separates the two cemeteries.

The  tract of land was established as a cemetery in 1849 at a cost of $20,000, six years after the founding of the Roman Catholic Diocese of Pittsburgh. As of 2008, it has more than 100,000 interments.

Notable burials
Bishops
 Hugh Charles Boyle (1873–1950)
 Regis Canevin (1853–1927)
 Richard Phelan (1828–1904)

Others
 Joseph M. Barr, Mayor of Pittsburgh (1906–1982)
 Bartley Campbell, playwright (1843–1888)
 James B. Drew, Chief Justice of Pennsylvania (1877–1953)
 Thomas Enright, soldier (1887–1917)
 Andrew Arnold Lambing, priest-historian (1842–1918)
 Bernard J. McKenna, Mayor of Pittsburgh (1842–1903)
 Thomas Meighan, early film star (1879–1936)

References

External links

 Catholic Cemeteries Association, Diocese of Pittsburgh website
 

Cemeteries in Pittsburgh
Roman Catholic cemeteries in Pennsylvania
History of Pittsburgh
Lawrenceville (Pittsburgh)